Roy Bubb (23 June 1900 – 4 April 1965) was an Australian cricketer. He played two first-class matches for New South Wales in 1924/25.

See also
 List of New South Wales representative cricketers

References

External links
 

1900 births
1965 deaths
Australian cricketers
New South Wales cricketers
Cricketers from Sydney